José Antonio Sáinz de Vicuña created IMPALA in the 1960s, a company which has produced over one hundred films directed by several of Spain's top directors. At present it owns sixty five negatives, several of them considered classics.

He is a graduate of Yale University, where he was a senior editor of campus humor magazine The Yale Record.

He was President of Warner Española, a company which was in partnership with Warner Bros. and during thirty years distributed all WB products in Spain. Was also President of Warner Home Video in Spain during ten years.

As Vice President of Incine, he was also involved in the distribution of 20th Century Fox films between 1970 and 1988. At different times during those last decades also distributed Columbia Pictures, Disney and PolyGram while this company remained active.

He was on the Board of Cinesa, Spain's leading theatrical chain, as well as on the Board of Warner-Lusomundo Theaters.

He created CINEPAQ together with Canal+ France. In 1992 CINEPAQ merged with IDEA, a company belonging to the PRISA GROUP, and formed SOGEPAQ. He was President of SOGEPAQ, a company which financed most of Spain's top box office films during the last twenty years as well as creating the largest modern catalogue of Spanish feature films.

From 1997 to 2000 he was a member of the Board of the European Film Academy.

In 2000 he became President of PLURAL, a new PRISA audiovisual production company.

Together with Luis García Berlanga and Alfredo Matas, conceived and promoted.  

Ciudad de la Luz Studios in Alicante, one of Europe's most modern Studios .35 films have been shot in CDLL since it began operating in 2005.  

In 2006 decided to revive Impala's activities while remaining as a consultant to PLURAL. Besides films IMPALA is now involved in developing TV series and programs – at present it is developing a Mexican co production with TVE – and theatrical plays together with SABRE, a company with a long record of successes in the theater.

In 2007 he was awarded EGEDA's Gold Medal.

In 2010 he started the creation of a new branch of IMPALA, IMPALA Digital, producing content for the Internet including Social media. 

As a producer, distributor and initiator of several audiovisual ventures, Jose Vicuña's main objective during his career has always been to promote Spanish creative talent both inside and outside Spain.

Filmography

References

External links
 

Film studio executives
Living people
Year of birth missing (living people)